Annie Johnson might refer to:

Fictional characters
Annie Johnson, character in Annie-for-Spite
Annie Johnson, character in Imitation of Life (1959 film)

Other uses
 , formerly known as Annie Johnson, a cruise ship
Annie Johnson (brewer), brewer

See also
Anne Johnson (disambiguation)
Annie Johnston (disambiguation)